Lens is a Dutch patronymic surname. The given name Lens is a now rare short form of Laurens. Notable people with the surname include:

 Andries Cornelis Lens (1739–1822), Flemish painter
 Anton Lens (1884–1955), Dutch footballer
 Bernard Lens I (1630/31–1707), Dutch painter and writer who moved to England
 Bernard Lens II (1659–1725), English engraver, mezzotinter, and publisher, son of the above
 Bernard Lens III (1682–1740), English portrait miniaturist, son of the above
 Dennis Lens (born 1977), Dutch badminton player

 Jeremain Lens (born 1987), Dutch-Surinamese footballer
 Louis Lens (1924–2001), Flemish rose breeder
 Nicholas Lens (born 1957), Belgian composer
 Sidney Lens (1912–1986), American labor leader, political activist and writer, born as Sid Okun
 Sigi Lens (born 1963), Dutch-Surinamese footballer and sports agent

See also
 Lense, a German-language surname
 Arnoud de Lens (c.1510–1582), Dutch humanist philosopher and poet known as Arnoldus Arlenius

References

Dutch-language surnames
Patronymic surnames